Bee Branch Creek is a stream in the U.S. state of California. It is in Mendocino County. It is a tributary of Alder Creek.

References

Rivers of Northern California
Rivers of Mendocino County, California